The 2005 Colgate Raiders football team was an American football team that represented Colgate University during the 2005 NCAA Division I-AA football season. Colgate won the Patriot League co-championship but lost in the first round of the NCAA Division I-AA national playoffs.

In its 10th season under head coach Dick Biddle, the team compiled a 8–4 record (8–3 in the regular season). Jared Nepa and Mike Saraceno were the team captains.

The Raiders outscored opponents 283 to 245. Colgate's 5–1 conference record tied with Lafayette for first in the Patriot League standings. Colgate was awarded the Patriot League's automatic berth in the national playoffs, though co-champion Lafayette also participated, as an at-large selection. Both teams lost their first-round games.

Throughout the regular season, Colgate was unranked in the Division I-AA national top 25. Just before the start of the playoffs, the Raiders entered the poll at No. 24. In the year-end rankings, they rose to No. 23.

Colgate played its home games at Andy Kerr Stadium in Hamilton, New York.

Schedule

References

Colgate
Colgate Raiders football seasons
Patriot League football champion seasons
Colgate Raiders football